Nintendo gamebooks are novels based on video games created by Nintendo. The gamebooks feature characters and settings from the Super Mario and The Legend of Zelda franchises, in two series, Nintendo Adventure Books and You Decide on the Adventure.

Nintendo Adventure Books
The Nintendo Adventure Books series of 12 books was created by Russell Ginns, author of the Samantha Spinner series. It was published from 1991 to 1992 by Simon and Schuster in the United States and Archway Books and Mammoth Books in the United Kingdom. They are formatted like the popular Choose Your Own Adventure books, where the story progresses with the reader's decisions. Ten of the books are about the adventures of the Mario Bros. in the Mushroom Kingdom and are based primarily on the Valiant comics published for the Nintendo Comics System imprint. Books nine and ten are about Link from The Legend of Zelda series.

Each book is 121 pages long, containing various puzzles such as mazes and word searches.

Some of the books were re-released as a promotion for Pringles.

Double Trouble (1991) by Clyde Bosco
Leaping Lizards (1991) by Clyde Bosco
Monster Mix-Up (1991) by Bill McCay
Koopa Capers (1991) by Bill McCay
Pipe Down! (1991) by Clyde Bosco
Doors to Doom (1991) by Bill McCay
Dinosaur Dilemma (1991) by Clyde Bosco
Flown the Koopa (1991) by Matt Wayne
The Crystal Trap (1992) by Matt Wayne
The Shadow Prince (1992) by Matt Wayne
Unjust Desserts (1992) by Matt Wayne
Brain Drain (1992) by Matt Wayne

You Decide on the Adventure
The You Decide on the Adventure series has four gamebooks published by Scholastic from 2001 to 2002. All four were written by Craig Wessel, based on Game Boy Advance and Game Boy Color games.

Super Mario Advance (2001), based on Super Mario Advance
The Legend of Zelda: Oracle of Seasons (2001), based on The Legend of Zelda: Oracle of Seasons
The Legend of Zelda: Oracle of Ages (2002), based on The Legend of Zelda: Oracle of Ages
Wario Land 4 (2002), based on Wario Land 4

See also

 Nintendo Comics System
 Worlds of Power

References

Gamebooks
Adventure Books
Series of children's books
Novels based on video games